Konstantinos Kefalas (born 1890, date of death unknown) was a Greek sports shooter. He competed in six events at the 1920 Summer Olympics.

References

External links
 

1890 births
Year of death missing
Greek male sport shooters
Olympic shooters of Greece
Shooters at the 1920 Summer Olympics
Place of birth missing
20th-century Greek people